Joseph Howley, from Oranmore, County Galway, was a member of the Irish Volunteers.  He mobilized and led a combined contingent of 106 Volunteers from Oranmore Including Tommy Furey and neighboring Maree on Easter Tuesday morning of the 1916 Easter Rising.  Their plan was to attack the Oranmore barracks. The company failed to capture the barracks, and his men to join those of Liam Mellows. According to the reports, Howley was the revenue collector-general. 

Howley was shot dead by the R.I.C at the Broadstone Railway Station in Dublin, Ireland, on 4 December 1920  A special Intelligence Unit attached to the RIC known as the Cairo Gang was responsible.
A memorial statue to him was erected in 1947 in Howley Court in Oranmore; its inscription reads:

See also
 Pádraig Ó Fathaigh

References 

1920 deaths
Irish Republican Army (1919–1922) members
People from County Galway
Year of birth missing
Deaths by firearm in Ireland
People of the Easter Rising
Irish Republicans killed during the Irish War of Independence